Mordellina monocalcarata is a species of beetle in the genus Mordellina. It was described in 1967.

References

Mordellidae
Beetles described in 1967